The New Generation Poets is a group of 1994 British poets whose work was featured in a month-long nationwide festival, many of the writers going on to considerable popular success. The 20 poets were chosen by a panel of judges comprising Melvyn Bragg (non-voting chair), poets Michael Longley and Vicki Feaver, literary critic James Wood, Margaret Busby (publisher and author) and John Osborne (Professor of American Studies at Hull University and editor of the poetry magazine Bête Noire).

The New Generation Poets were featured in an edition of The South Bank Show, presented by Melvyn Bragg, on 2 October 1994, and were also the focus of a special issue of Poetry Review.

The list of poets comprises:

Moniza Alvi
Simon Armitage
John Burnside
Robert Crawford
David Dabydeen 
Michael Donaghy 
Carol Ann Duffy
Ian Duhig
Elizabeth Garrett
Lavinia Greenlaw
W. N. Herbert
Michael Hofmann
Mick Imlah
Kathleen Jamie 
Jamie McKendrick
Sarah Maguire 
Glyn Maxwell
Don Paterson
Pauline Stainer
Susan Wicks.

See also
 Next Generation poets (2004)
 Next Generation poets (2014)

References

British literary movements
British poetry